Les Ross MBE is a British disc jockey in the West Midlands. He was born as Leslie Meakin; 7 February 1949, in Birmingham.

Early life and career

Ross always wanted to become a DJ and, at the age of 11, wrote to the general manager of Radio Luxembourg.

He attended King Edward VI Aston School in Aston, Birmingham and left with 10 O Levels. His first job after school was at IBM, but he left after one year. His next job was as a clerk at Witton Cemetery.

At the age of 17, Ross won a DJ competition run by the Birmingham Evening Mail, beating Johnnie Walker, who came in second. Part of his prize was to appear at Radio Luxembourg for an audition, but this never happened. He was offered his first gig at the Mecca Ballroom in Birmingham before moving on to the Birmingham Rollerskating Rink.

BBC Radio WM
The break he was waiting for came in 1970 when he joined BBC Radio Birmingham (which became BBC Radio WM in 1980), presenting a 90 minute Saturday morning show with John Henry called “The Ross and Henry Show”.  It was one of the first "zoo-radio" formats – involving a studio audience and interactive elements, competitions and phone-in requests that were presented by Fiona MacDonald.

The breakfast show, entitled "On The Move", was unique at the BBC at the time, due to its early 5am start time. The BBC national networks did not start broadcasting until 6am, making Ross the only presenter on the air in the UK during that hour. The Radio Birmingham transmitter at 5.5 kW was the most powerful local radio transmitter in the country located at Sutton Coldfield. Ross enjoyed an audience of shift workers around the UK and occasionally even overseas.

Radio Tees and BRMB
In 1974, Ross's initial application to BRMB was rejected and he subsequently joined Radio Tees in the North East of England presenting their breakfast show in the summer of 1975. Ross also presented a successful Saturday morning music show which used the talents of the station's record librarian Wincey Willis as co-presenter. In March 1976, he returned to Birmingham and joined BRMB, taking over the breakfast show from Adrian Juste, who had left to join BBC Radio 1.

Ross won many awards, including 'Independent Radio Personality of the Year Award' in 1986, and in 1997 he received a Sony Award. He was appointed Member of the Most Excellent Order of the British Empire (MBE) in the 1996 Birthday Honours for services to radio broadcasting.

Revolver
Ross also co-hosted Revolver, a British music series made by ATV in Birmingham that ran for eight episodes on the ITV network in 1978, alongside Peter Cook. The late-night show, filmed with a live audience, was set in a seedy ballroom-turned-rock venue. In his role of assistant manager, Les Ross ran a hamburger stand while offering rock trivia gems and introducing the "Revolver Reviver" nostalgia spot.

Xtra AM and return to BRMB
With the launch of sister station Xtra AM in 1989, Ross moved on to present there for four years. In August 1993, Ross returned to BRMB to host Breakfast show, where he had female co-presenters by his side during this period, including Suzi Becker and Tammy Gooding. After 26 years of broadcasting, on Friday 27 September 2002, Ross presented his final BRMB Breakfast show, live from Birmingham International station. As 9 o'clock approached, he boarded a Virgin Trains West Coast train hauled by electric locomotive no. 86259 especially named 'Les Ross' to mark the end of his BRMB radio career.

He later purchased and preserved this locomotive in operational condition following its retirement from regular passenger service. Locomotive 86259 has been returned to mainline use and sees use on various rail tours, painted in it original 1960s British Rail electric blue livery.

Saga 105.7

On Monday 6 January 2003, Ross took over from David Hamilton, on Birmingham's Saga 105.7 FM breakfast show. However, in December 2004, he quit the station as he claimed the station management was guilty of sending "nannying" e-mails which were turning him into a "robo-jock" and was apparently barred from drinking coffee during his early show.

He announced his departure, planned for Christmas Eve 2004, after he was only offered a one-year contract, below half-pay, despite doubling the show's ratings in recent audience research figures. Ross stated "How much would I have had to put the ratings up by just to get the same deal as I was on before? If I had been happy and felt that I had support, I might have stayed for half the money. But I wasn't happy and I feel that if you pay peanuts, you get monkeys." His departure came before Christmas Eve, as station bosses decided to take action when Ross spoke to the local press about what had happened.

Back to the BBC Radio
Rumour mills went quickly into action about where Ross would turn up next. BBC Radio WM re-hired him to present a weekly show on Sundays from 9am to midday. On Sunday 6 February 2005, Ross presented his first weekly show on BBC Radio WM. He would also cover for various holidaying presenters on the station including Adrian Goldberg, Ed Doolan and Danny Kelly, which Ross would later take over the afternoon show permanently.

In addition to his Sunday morning show, on Saturday 23 July 2005, Ross also took over the Saturday Breakfast show from 6 to 9am.

Back on daily
Ross took over the Monday to Friday 1 to 4pm slot from Danny Kelly on WM on Tuesday 10 April 2007.

BBC WM's managing editor, Keith Beech, said: "Les Ross is one of the best-loved and most popular presenters there is. I'm excited about the prospect of hearing him every day here on BBC WM."

In early 2009, the show went out from 2 to 4pm on weekdays and has since left the station just after his 60th Birthday.

On 7 December 2009, Les Ross returned to the airwaves when he became the presenter of the Big City Breakfast Show on Birmingham's Big City Radio 89.1. He hosted his final show for the station on Friday 26 March 2010. He returned to the station on 10 February 2013 to front a Sunday afternoon show.

In April 2015, Les Ross started broadcasting on Wolverhampton's 101.8 WCRFM: www.wcrfm.com. He currently presents a two-hour weekly Sixties show at Sunday lunchtime.

Boom Radio and WCR-FM
In February 2021, a new, national station called Boom Radio was launched on DAB and online, catering to the 'boomer generation'.  Les Ross currently presents a show on Sunday mornings between 10am and noon.
Les also presents a Sixties show on WCR FM in Wolverhampton on Sundays 12-2pm.

References

External links
Les Ross on Boom Radio
Link to Guardian piece on the Hardeep Singh Kohli interview, including sound clip
His Radio Academy Hall of Fame entry
Les Ross interview
Class 86 Locomotive 86259/E3137 'Les Ross' owned by Les Ross

1949 births
People educated at King Edward VI Aston School
Living people
British radio DJs
British radio personalities
Members of the Order of the British Empire